Fábio Pizarro Sanches (born 6 January 1991) is a Brazilian professional footballer who plays as a defender for Ponte Preta.

Professional career
Sanches made his professional debut with Mogi Mirim in a 5-1 Campeonato Paulista loss to Palmeiras on 16 January 2010.

Honours
Paysandu
Campeonato Paraense: 2013

Goiás
Campeonato Goiano: 2017, 2018

References

External links
 

1991 births
Living people
People from São José dos Campos
Brazilian footballers
Association football defenders
Mogi Mirim Esporte Clube players
América Futebol Clube (RN) players
Paysandu Sport Club players
Clube Atlético Sorocaba players
Esporte Clube XV de Novembro (Piracicaba) players
Avaí FC players
Goiás Esporte Clube players
Associação Atlética Ponte Preta players
Campeonato Brasileiro Série A players
Campeonato Brasileiro Série B players
Campeonato Brasileiro Série C players
Footballers from São Paulo (state)